Raíces is a Mexican village on the slopes of the volcano Nevado de Toluca in the Municipio of Zinacantepec, Estado de México at the altitude of 3,531 metres. The population of the village is around 500 people. 

Raíces compares with Alma, Colorado (population 270) at an elevation of approximately 10,578 feet (3,224 m), the highest incorporated municipality in the US.

References

Populated places in the State of Mexico
Zinacantepec